Henry Pollack is an American emeritus professor of geophysics at the University of Michigan. Pollack received his A.B. from Cornell University in 1958 and Ph.D in 1963 from the University of Michigan. He is also an advisor to the National Science Foundation and an author (along with 2000 other people) of a report by the Intergovernmental Panel on Climate Change which was awarded the 2007 Nobel Peace Prize with Al Gore.  Pollack has conducted scientific research on all seven continents and has traveled regularly to Antarctica.
 
In 2010, Pollack wrote the book A World Without Ice which provides an analysis of climate change science.  In 2003, he wrote Uncertain Science ... Uncertain World.

References

External links
University of Michigan: Henry Pollack
ResearchGate for Henry Pollack

University of Michigan alumni
American geophysicists
American climatologists
American non-fiction environmental writers
Cornell University alumni
Living people
Sustainability advocates
University of Michigan faculty
1936 births